Thomas Adamson-Koumbouzis is a Culture Correspondent for Associated Press based in Paris. He is formerly a presenter for the global newschannel, France 24. Until 2007, Adamson filmed and reported for Channel 4 News at ITN.

Education
Adamson was educated at UCL and City University in London and La Sorbonne in Paris. He speaks French, Italian and Greek.

Professional Work
In 2019, Adamson broke the exclusive story that billionaire donors who pledged money to rebuild Notre Dame cathedral hadn't paid a penny toward the restoration. The story pressured several billionaire donors to make their first downpayments to the cathedral totaling over 20 million euros ($24 million) within days of the article appearing. Subsequent reporting also revealed that Notre Dame would miss its first Christmas since the French Revolution and that France did not have adequate safety regulations for the lead dust spewed out by the fire.

Adamson also investigated (and is credited as being one of the first to uncover) the story that a series of French widows from the 19th century, whose husbands died in sudden or mysterious circumstances, were responsible for creating the modern champagne industry. 
Adamson's article was highly impactful, creating an online universe for these icons that include Widow Clicquot and Widow Pommery, who are thought to be the Western world's first female CEOs. Following Adamson's reporting, champagne tastings based on the widows' story also were created in Australia and in the United States. 

Adamson interviewed Hollywood legend Olivia de Havilland on her 100th birthday, during which she finally broke her decades-long silence on her feud with Oscar-winning sister Joan Fontaine.

Adamson has also worked for Associated Press as a fashion writer, known to have interviewed Chanel's former designer, the late Karl Lagerfeld, over 20 times. It was in Adamson's 2016 interview with the larger-than-life couturier in which Lagerfeld seemed to blame Kim Kardashian for being targeted in a controversial jewelry heist during Paris Fashion Week because she was "too flashy". 

Adamson started in print at Associated Press in Paris in 2003. His foray into TV began on French design program Paris Modes, where he covered the catwalks at London Fashion Week.

He then worked as TF1's UK producer covering the aftermath of the 7/7 bomb attacks, and at GMTV's politics show The Sunday Programme where he produced their Climate Change special.

Since the launch in 2005 of Channel 4’s More4 News Adamson reported on Culture and European news for ITN, and was dispatched across Europe. Adamson’s work featured exposes on the closure of the window brothels in Amsterdam, and the dire plight of the Greek economy after the Athens Olympic Games.

References

External links
France 24 
 A Week in the Magreb programme - France 24
   The Guardian article on controversy over Adamson interviewing Tehran journalist as he gets detained by police (Friday 6 November 2009) 

Culture / Channel 4 News
 Cultural reporting: Sydney Pollack on Architect Frank Gehry
 Culture reporting: Lauren Greenfield's Thin Documentary
 Report on Robert Greenwald's film 'Iraq for Sale'

Awards
APME Award for Deadline Reporting on 2015's Paris Attacks

Living people
People educated at Leeds Grammar School
Year of birth missing (living people)